Love Island Sweden is the first season of the Swedish version of Love Island. The series premiered on 19 August 2018 and is broadcast on Sjuan. The series is filmed in Corfu, Greece. Through app voting the viewers can vote on which contestants should date each other and who has to leave the Love Island Villa over a six-week filming period.

References

External links 
 
 

2018 Swedish television series debuts
Television shows filmed in Greece
Swedish reality television series
Sweden
Swedish television series based on British television series